The Dozovka is a river in Perm Krai, Russia, a left tributary of the Veslyana, which in turn is a tributary of the Kama. The Dozovka River flows into Veslyana  from its mouth. The main tributary is the Tsibin (left).

References 

Rivers of Perm Krai